Gogolewo  is a village in the administrative district of Gmina Marianowo, within Stargard County, West Pomeranian Voivodeship, in north-western Poland.

References

Gogolewo